Pablo de Olavide University (Universidad Pablo de Olavide (UPO) in Spanish) is a public university in Seville, Spain. UPO offers both undergraduate and graduate programs in the traditional majors, as well as in biotechnology, environmental sciences, humanities, labor relations, second language acquisition, social work, sports sciences, and translation.

Pablo de Olavide University (UPO) was founded in 1997, making it one of the newest public universities in Spain. UPO has over 10,000 students and is growing constantly since its inception.

The university is named after the Spanish-Peruvian politician Pablo de Olavide (1725–1803), who contributed notably to planning the city of Seville.

Being a relatively young university, UPO was planned as a North American-style campus with dedicated academic and residential space.
Its 345-acres spread out southeast of Seville over the municipalities of Dos Hermanas, Alcalá de Guadaíra and Seville. Its facilities are modern, including campus-wide Wi-Fi and Internet access, computer, television, video and audio centers, an open access library, sports facilities, and science laboratories.

It has numerous sports facilities, lawns, gym and a huge library where you can find books from every subject.
This University also boasts a student union building and offers transportation to the city center by bus or metro.

Academics 
The university is organized into seven faculties and schools:
 Faculty of Experimental Sciences
 Faculty of Business
 Faculty of Social Sciences
 Faculty of Sport
 Faculty of Law, Universidad Pablo de Olavide of Seville. Degrees in Law; Political Science and Public Administration; Criminology; and Human Resources
 Faculty of Humanities
 Polytechnic School
 Postgraduate Studies Centre

Bachelor’s Degrees 

 Law
 Business Management and Administration
 Accounting & Finance
 Political and Administration Sciences
 Labour Relations and Human Resources
 Geography and History
 Sociology
 Translation and Interpreting (English, French or German)
 Social Work
 Social Education
 Humanities
 Biotechnology
 Environmental Science
 Human Nutrition and Dietetics
 Sport and Exercise Sciences
 Computer Engineering in Information Systems
 Criminology
 Economic Analisis

Double Degrees 
 Social Work and Social Education
 Sociology and Social Work
 Sociology and Political Science and Public Administration
 Law & Political And Administration Sciences
 Law & Business Management and Administration
 Law + Accounting & Finance
 Humanities & Translation and Interpreting

Graduate Studies 
The broad range of official master's degrees and doctoral studies offered by Pablo de Olavide University will allow students to specialize within a professional field or to start a career as researchers. 
CEDEP is the center responsible for the coordination of graduate studies. This centre is responsible for the inscription, enrolment and grant proceedings.

Since January 2011 Pablo de Olavide University, in conjunction with Brussels-based human rights NGO Protection International, have offered an online Postgraduate Diploma (PgDip) on the Integral Protection for Human Rights Defenders and Social Activists in both English and Spanish. The PgDip is aimed at staff of NGOs and human rights association activists; civil servants from the different local, community and national administrations; staff from international and inter-governmental organisations; and citizens willing to be involved in social transformation processes.

The International Center 
As of the 2010-2011 academic year, the UPO enrolled 600 international students. The UPO began admitting North American study abroad students in 2001, and founded the International Center in 2002. The center manages the three program tracks available to incoming students. The most popular is the semester-long Hispanic Studies Program with courses both in Spanish and in English.  The Center also offers the University Integration Program (P.I.U.) for students with advanced Spanish language skills, as well as a Spanish Language track throughout the year.  The Center is accredited by the Cervantes Institute.

Additionally, 268 universities and organizations from 42 countries have signed agreements with the UPO to set up exchanges, such as Academic Programs International (API), the Council on International Educational Exchange (CIEE) and International Studies Abroad.

Sports 
In the University’s Sports Service (SDUPO) the practice of physical activities and sports are thought to be the key element for the integral preparation of the student. In order to encourage students, it makes the practice of sports possible to the entire university community. For this reason, the University has several sports facilities, located directly on the Campus.

Furthermore, the Sports Office plans, manages and organizes sports activities at Pablo de Olavide University. It makes sure the University has the appropriate facilities, services, and competitions needed for the practice of sports. The UPO also offers the possibility to study sport in the Faculty of Sports. The Sports Office Director is Juan Carlos Fernández Truan.

Statistics 
Year 2010
 Since 1997
 10,741 Students (57.63% Women; 42.37% Men)
 1,032 Teaching Staff
 65 Research Groups
 18 degrees & 6 double degrees (2010–2011)
 40 Official master's degree Programs
 18 Doctorate Degrees
 136 ha Campus
 100,000 square meters in Sports facilities
 5 km - Distance to city center
 635 Companies collaborate with UPO
 268 Universities from 42 countries have signed agreements with UPO
 748,860 Library resources
 €80,160,718.22 -  2010 Budget
 It holds the No. 3 position in the Ranking of Research Output of Spanish Universities

Programmes and scholarships 
There are various programmes and international scholarship that offer the students of Pablo de Olavide University the possibility to travel abroad. Among the most prominent are:
 Erasmus Programme
 Programme Atlanticus (bilateral programmes with universities in the USA, Canada and Australia) 
 PIMA (“Intercambio y Movilidad Académica”, programme of the Organization of Ibero-American States)
 Programme Mexicalia (bilateral programme with universities in Mexico)
 Programme UPO-PUCP (bilateral programme with universities in Peru)
 Programme "Becas Iberoamérica Santander"

Summer Courses in Carmona 
The Summer Courses of UPO take place every summer in Carmona, Seville. Everyone can attend these courses.

See also 
 Rosario Valpuesta

References

External links 
 Pablo de Olavide University website
 Campus view in Google Maps

1997 establishments in Spain
Education in Seville
Pablo de Olavide University
Educational institutions established in 1997
Buildings and structures in Seville
Universities and colleges in Spain
Universities in Andalusia